Apriona buruensis is a species of beetle in the family Cerambycidae. It was described by Ritsema in 1898. It is known from the Moluccas and Papua New Guinea.

References

Batocerini
Beetles described in 1898